The Cornell Lab of Ornithology is a member-supported unit of Cornell University in Ithaca, New York, which studies birds and other wildlife. It is housed in the Imogene Powers Johnson Center for Birds and Biodiversity in Sapsucker Woods Sanctuary. Approximately 250 scientists, professors, staff, and students work in a variety of programs devoted to the Lab's mission: interpreting and conserving the Earth's biological diversity through research, education, and citizen science focused on birds. Work at the Lab is supported primarily by its 75,000 members. 

The Cornell Lab publishes books under the Cornell Lab Publishing Group, a quarterly publication, Living Bird magazine, and a monthly electronic newsletter. It manages numerous citizen science projects and websites, including the Webby Award-winning All About Birds.

History
The Cornell Lab of Ornithology was founded by Arthur A. Allen, who had lobbied for the creation of the country's first graduate program in ornithology; the Lab was established at Cornell University in 1915. Initially, the Lab of Ornithology was housed in the university’s entomology and limnology department.

Birder/businessman Lyman Stuart, donors, and landowners purchased or donated farmland in 1954, which was to be set aside for the sanctuary. Stuart helped finance the construction of the first Lab building in 1957. Lab founder Arthur Allen (along with colleagues Louis Agassiz Fuertes, James Gutsell, and Francis Harper) had dubbed the area “Sapsucker Woods” after discovering the first breeding pair of yellow-bellied sapsucker ever reported in the Cayuga Lake Basin; this species of woodpecker is now common in the area, and is part of the Cornell Lab's logo.

Today, the Cornell Lab of Ornithology is housed in the Imogene Powers Johnson Center for Birds and Biodiversity, which opened in the summer of 2003.

Building and grounds

The  Sapsucker Woods Sanctuary contains more than four miles (6 km) of trails taking visitors around Sapsucker Pond, on boardwalks, through wetlands and forest. More than 230 species of birds have been recorded in the sanctuary. Approximately 55,000 people visit the sanctuary and public areas of the Cornell Lab each year. The Visitor Center is open daily from 10:00 a.m. to 4:00 p.m.

Organization
The Lab is an administrative unit within Cornell University.  It has a separate 30-member Administrative Board that is appointed by the Cornell Board of Trustees. As of fiscal year 2010, the Lab has an annual budget of $20.5 million and income of $21.9 million. It has 18 senior staff, which includes eight holding Cornell faculty appointments.

Citizen science
Collecting the observations of everyday birders for scientific use is a hallmark of the Lab. Bird watchers of all ages and skill levels help gather the data needed to capture the big picture about the distribution and abundance of birds. Nearly 600,000 people participate in the Lab's projects. The eBird database allows birders to track any of the earth's 10,585 bird species to a single scientific database. As of October 2020, almost 47.7 million checklists have been recorded, including observations of 10,511 species.

The Cornell Lab's citizen-science projects take place in all seasons and include Project FeederWatch, NestWatch, Celebrate Urban Birds, Birds in Forested Landscapes, CamClickr, and two projects in partnership with the National Audubon Society: eBird and the Great (Global) Backyard Bird Count. The Cornell Lab operates many NestCams which capture live video of nesting birds in the spring.

The Cornell Lab publishes the free Merlin Bird ID app for iOS and Android devices. This field guide and identification app guides users to put a name to the birds they see, and covers 3,000 species of across the Americas, Western Europe, and India. In addition to browsing customized lists of birds for any location in the world, users can answer simple questions to get a list of most likely species, along with images and sound. In 2017, Merlin Bird ID was updated to include AI-powered automatic photo recognition, which allows quick identification help with photographs. Bird ID and Photo ID require separate file downloads. The app also offers Sound ID, which can identify some 450 North American species, in real time or from an in-app recording, and even if multiple species are communicating at once. The app also displays a basic black-and-white spectrogram - a visual representation of sound.

Research
Cornell Lab scientists, students, and visiting scholars are carrying on much original research in behavioral ecology, conservation, education, evolutionary biology, information systems, and population genetics. Cornell Lab engineers also develop hardware and software tools used in researching bird and animal communication and patterns of movement.

In the Evolutionary Biology laboratory researchers are extracting DNA from living birds or specimens to uncover the relationships among species.

In addition to many studies and published papers, the Cornell Lab's Conservation Science Department has produced land managers' guides aimed at conserving dwindling populations of scarlet tanagers, wood thrushes, and other forest birds. The Lab worked with Partners in Flight to identify rapidly declining species and produce the first North American Landbird Conservation Plan. Lab staff also worked with multiple partners to create the first-ever State of the Birds report in March 2009.

The Lab's Neotropical Bird Conservation Program is gathering baseline data about bird populations in Mexico, where many North American birds spend their winters, and helping colleagues in other countries with conservation training and resources.

The Cornell Lab of Ornithology led the scientific arm of the search for the ivory-billed woodpecker, overseen by the U.S. Fish and Wildlife Service from 2004 to 2009.

Lab scientists are currently involved with partners from industry, government agencies, and non-governmental organizations in setting research priorities to better understand the impact of wind power facilities on birds and bats.

Bioacoustics research
The Lab's Bioacoustics Research Program (BRP) creates remote recording devices used by researchers in projects around the world. These autonomous recording units (ARUs) consist of a hard drive, housing, and microphone array that can be mounted in a forest or anchored to the ocean floor. ARUs have been used in the Elephant Listening Project in Africa, studies of whales, and in the search for the ivory-billed woodpecker.

BRP has also developed sound-analysis software programs called Raven and Raven Lite. Engineers are working on programmable radio tags to track birds and other animals for longer periods of time and to follow bird migrations.

Media archives
From its earliest days, the Cornell Lab has had a special interest in bird and animal sounds. Founder Arthur Allen and his students were pioneers in the field, recording the first bird songs on a film sound track.

The Macaulay Library has since expanded and is now the world's premier scientific archive of natural history audio, video, and photographs. The library hosts over 14 million audio, video and photographs . Macaulay Library archivists continue to mount expeditions to collect wildlife sounds, images, and video from around the world to expand the archive.

Information science
The Information Science unit creates the underlying structure that makes the Cornell Lab's citizen-science projects work. It also converts massive amounts of data into charts, maps, and tables. Computer programmers at the Lab built the infrastructure for the Birds of North America Online and are now coordinating the Avian Knowledge Network, an unprecedented effort to link bird data records kept at institutions all over the Western Hemisphere. As of October 2009, the AKN contained more than 66.5 million records, accessible to anyone.

Cornell University Museum of Vertebrates
The Cornell University Museum of Vertebrates is also housed in the Johnson Center and holds 1,230,000 specimens of fish, 44,300 amphibians and reptiles, 45,000 birds, 3,200 eggs, and 15,000 mammals, some now extinct. Students and scientists use the collections in their studies.

References

Cited

Other
Living Bird Magazine, Autumn 2003,

External links
 Cornell Lab of Ornithology

Ornithology
Ornithology
Zoological research institutes
Ornithological organizations in the United States
Research institutes in New York (state)
Nature centers in New York (state)
Tourist attractions in Ithaca, New York
1915 establishments in New York (state)
Bird conservation organizations